Philosophers born in the 11th through 14th centuries (and others important in the history of philosophy), listed alphabetically:

Note: This list has a minimal criterion for inclusion and the relevance to philosophy of some individuals on the list is disputed.

A 
 Abner of Burgos (1270–1348)*
 Adam Parvipontanus (died 1181)
Abraham ben Moses Maimonides (or Abraham ben Maimon; 1186–1237)
 Adelard of Bath (12th century)
Atīśa (982–1054)
Akka Mahadevi (c.1130–1160)
Akshobhya Tirtha (c. 1282- c. 1365)
 Alain de Lille (c. 1128 – 1202)
Al-Ghazali (1058–1111)
 Albert of Saxony (c. 1316 – 1390)
 Albertus Magnus (or Albert the Great or Albert of Cologne; -1280)*
 Alexander of Hales (died 1245)
Amalananda (13th century)
Al-Hilli (1250–1325)
Abraham ibn Ezra (1092 or 1093–1167)*
 Anselm (1034–1109)
Abu al-Hakam al-Kirmani (12th century)
 Averroes (or Ibn Rushd; 1126–1198)*
Abraham bar Hiyya Ha-Nasi (1070–1136)
Abul Maali al-Juwayni (1028–1085)

B 
 Bartolus de Saxoferrato (1313–1357)
 Bernard of Chartres (died 1130)
Bahya ibn Paquda (1040–1110)
Bhoja (1010–1055)
 Bernard of Clairvaux (1090–1153)
 Bernard Silvestris (or Bernard of Tours; 1147–1178)
 Basaveshwara (1134–1196)
Basava (1130-1667)
Basil Bessarion (1395–1472)*
 Blasius of Parma (or Biagio Pelacani da Parma; 1345–1416)
 Boetius of Dacia
 Bonaventure (1221–1274)

C 
 Cavalcante de' Cavalcanti (died c. 1280)
 Chang Tsai (or Zhang Zai; 1020–1077)
Chakradhar Swami (13th century)
Cheng Hao (or Ch'eng Ming-Tao; 1032–1085)
 Cheng Yi (or Ch'eng Yi Chu'an; 1033–1107)
 Chou Tun-Yi (or Zhou Dunyi or Chou Lien-Hsi or Zhou Lianxi; 1017–1073)
 Christine de Pizan (c. 1365 – c. 1430)
 Clarembald of Arras (1110–1187)

D 
 David of Dinant (12th century)
Dnyaneshwar (1275–1296)
Dante Alighieri (1265–1321)
Dominicus Gundissalinus (12th century)
 Dogen (also Dogen Zenji or Dōgen Kigen; 1200–1253)
 Duns Scotus (c. 1266 – 1308)
 Durandus of St. Pourçain (c. 1275 – 1334)

E

F 
 Francis of Assisi (1181–1226)
 Francis of Marchia
 Francis of Meyronnes (1285–1328)

G 
 Gangeśa (fl. c. 1325)
 Gennadius Scholarius (died c. 1473)
 George of Trebizond (1395–1484)
Gangesha Upadhyaya (14th century)
 Gerard of Cremona (1114–1187)
 Gerard of Odo (or Gerald Odonis; 1290–1349)
 Gersonides (or Levi ben Gershon; 1288–1344)
 Gilbert of Poitiers (1070–1154)
 Giles of Rome (c. 1243 – 1316)
 Godfrey of Fontaines (c. 1250 – 1309)
 Gregory of Rimini (died 1358)

H 
 Henry of Ghent (c. 1217 – 1293)*
 Henry of Harclay (1270–1317)
Hasdai Crescas (c. 1340 – 1410)*
Hibat Allah Abu'l-Barakat al-Baghd\aadi (1080–1165)
Hemachandra (1088-1173)
 Herman of Carinthia
 Hervaeus Natalis (or Hervé Nedellec; 1250–1323)
 Hildegard of Bingen (1098–1179)
 Hillel ben Samuel of Verona (1220–1295)
 Hu Hung (or Wu-Feng; 1100–1155)
 Hugh of St Victor (c. 1078 – 1141)

I 
 Ibn Arabi (1165–1240)
 Ibn Bajjah (also Avempace; died 1138)
 Ibn Daud (also Rabad I or Avendauth or John of Spain; 1110–1180)*
 Ibn Kammuna (1215–1284)
 Ibn Khaldun (1332–1406)
 Ibn Sabin (1217–1268)
 Ibn Taymiya (1263–1328)
 Ibn Tufail (1110–1185)
 Ibn Tzaddik (c. 1149)
 Immanuel the Roman (or Immanuel of Rome)

J 
 James of Viterbo (1255–1308)
 Jinul (or Chinul; 1158–1210)
Joseph Kaspi (12th century)*
 Joachim of Fiore (1135–1201)
Jayatirtha  (c.1345 - c.1388)
Jan Hus (1369–1415)
 John of Jandun (1280–1328)
 John of La Rochelle (1190–1245)
johannes Capreolus (1380–1444)
Jean Buridan (1300–1358)
 John of Mirecourt (c. 1345)
 John of Paris (1260–1306)
Jean Gerson (1363–1429)
 John of Salisbury (c. 1115 – 1180)
 Judah ben Moses of Rome (or Judah Romano; 1292–1330)
 Judah Ben Samuel of Regensburg (c. 1200)

K 
Khana (12th century)
Kavindra Tirtha   (c. 1333 - c.1398)

L 
 Lu Hsiang-shan (or Lu Xiangshan, also Lu Chiu-yuan or Tzu-ching or Ts'un-chai; 1139–1193)

M 
 Shri Madhvacharya (1238–1317)
Moses Maimonides (also Rambam; 1135–1204)
 Marsilius of Inghen (1330–1396)
Madhava Tirtha (died 1350)
Manuel Chrysoloras (c. 1355 – 1415)
Moses ibn Ezra (1070–1138)
Mahapurna (12th century)
Meister Eckhart (1260–1327 or 1328)
Mamaidev (12th century)
 Marsilius of Padua (or  Marsiglio or Marsilio dei Mainardine; 1270–1342)
 Matthew of Aquasparta (1238–1302)

N 
 Moses Nahmanides (1194–1270)
Narayana Panditacharya (c. 1290 – c. 1370)
 Moses Narboni (c. 1300 – c. 1362)*
Narahari Tirtha (c. 1243 - c. 1333)
 Alexander Neckham (1157–1217)
Naropa (12th century)
 Nichiren (1222–1282)
Nimbarkacharya (1130 - .1200)
 Nicholas of Autrecourt (c. 1300 – 1369)
 Nimbarka ( century)

O 
 William of Ockham (-1349)
 Peter Olivi (1248–1298)
 Nicole Oresme (1320–1382)*
Omar Khayyám (1048–1131)

P 
 Paul of Venice (1369–1429)
 John Peckham (died 1292)
Peter Aureol (c. 1280 – 1322)
Pierre d'Ailly (1350–1420)
Profiat Duran (also Efodi or Isaac ben Moses Levi) (c. 1349 – c. 1414)
Pietro d'Abano ( – 1316)
Pietro Damiani (c. 1007 – 1072)
Peter Lombard (c. 1100 – 1160)
 William Penbygull (died 1420)
Prabhācandra (11th century)
 Peter of Auvergne (13th century)
 Peter of Spain (usually identified with Pope John XXI; 13th century)
 Petrarch (1304–1374)
 Joane Petrizi (12th century)*
Pillai Lokacharya (1205–1311)
Padmanabha Tirtha (died 1324)
Philip the Chancellor (1160–1236)
 George Gemistos Plethon (c. 1355 – 1452)
 Isaac Polgar (early 14th century)*
 Michael Psellus (11th century)
 Pseudo-Grosseteste (13th century)

Q

R 
 Ramanuja (1017–1137)
 Fakhr al-Din al-Razi (1149–1209)
Roger Bacon (1214–1294)*
Robert Alyngton (died 1398)
Roger Marston (1235–1303)
Richard Kilvington (or Richard Chillington; 1302–1361)
Robert Kilwardby (1215–1279)
Ramon Llull (1235–1315)
 Rgyal tshab dar ma rin chen (or Gyeltsap Darma Rinchen; 1364–1432)
 Richard of Middleton (c. 1249 – 1306)
Ratnakīrti (11th century )
Robert Holcot (1290–1349)
Radulphus Brito
Robert Grosseteste (or Robert of Lincoln or Robert Greathead; 1175–1253)*
 Richard of St. Victor (died 1173)
 Richard Rufus (or Richard of Cornwall or Richardus Sophista; 1231–1259)
 Roscelin of Compiègne
 Jan van Ruysbroek (1293–1381)
Richard Brinkley (–1373)

S 
 Sa skya pandita (also Sagya Pandita or Sagypandita; 1182–1251)
 Shao Yung (1011–1077)
 Johannes Sharpe (ca. 1360-after 1415)
 Shinran (1173–1261)
Solomon Ibn Gabirol (1021–1058)*
Shem Tob Ibn Falaquera (1223–1290)*
Someshvara III (1127 – 1138 CE)
Siddheshwar (12th century)
Samuel Ibn Tibbon (c. 1165 – 1232)
Simeon ben Zemah Duran (also Rashbaz) (1361–1444)
 Sigerus of Brabant (1240–1284)
 Simon of Faversham (–1306)
 Shihab al-Din Yahya ibn Habash ibn Amirak al-Sohravardi (or al-Suhrawardi; 1154–1191)
 Henry Suso (1300–1366)

T 
 Johannes Tauler (c. 1300 – 1361)
 Theodore Metochita (died 1332)
 Theodoric of Freiberg ( c.1250 – c.1311)
 Thierry of Chartres (fl. c. 1130 – 1150)
 Thomas à Kempis (1380–1471)
 Thomas of Erfurt (14th century)
Thomas Bradwardine (c. 1290 – 1349)
Thomas Aquinas (1225–1274)
 Thomas of York (13th century)
 Trivikrama Panditacharya  (c.1258 - c.1320)
 Je Tsongkhapa (or Dzongkaba or Rinpoche; 1357–1419)
 Nasir al-Din Tusi (1201–1274)

U 
 Ubertino of Casale (1259 – c. 1328)
 Udayana (11th century)
 Ulrich of Strasbourg (1220–1277)
 Urso of Calabria (died c. 1225)

V 
 Mādhava Vidyāranya, (c. 1268–1386)
Vedanta Desika  (1268–1369)
 Vincent of Beauvais (c. 1190 – c. 1264)
 Vincent Ferrer (1350–1419)
Vidyaranya (1296-1391)

Vedanta Desika  (1268–1369)
 Vital Du Four (1260–1327)
Vishnu Tirtha (13th century)

W 
 Walter of Ailly (13th century)
 Walter of Bruges (c. 1225 – 1307)
 Walter Hilton (c. 1343 – 1396)
 Walter of Mortagne (c. 1100 – 1174)
 William of Alnwick (1270–1333)
 William of Arnaud
William of Heytesbury (or Hentisberus or Hentisberi or Tisberi; 1313–1373)
William Crathorn (14th century)
 William of Auvergne, Bishop of Paris (1180–1249)*
 William of Auxerre (died 1231)
 William of Bonkes
Walter Chatton (1290–1343)
 William Buser (1339 – c. 1413)
 William of Champeaux (c. 1070 – 1121)
 William of Clifford (died 1306)
 William of Conches (c. 1080 – 1154)
 William of Durham (died 1249)
 William of Falgar (died 1297/8)
 William Hothum (c. 1245 – 1298)
 William de la Mare (fl. 1270s)
 William of Lucca (died 1178)
 William of Macclesfield (died 1303)
 William of Middleton (died c. 1260)
 William Milverley (fl. c. 1400)
 William of Moerbeke (c. 1215 – 1286)
 William of Nottingham I (died 1254)
 William of Nottingham II (c. 1282 – 1336)
 William of Pagula (c. 1290 – c. 1332)
 William Perault (c. 1200 – 1261)
 William Peter Godin (c. 1260 – 1336)
 William of Rubio (born c. 1290)
 William of Saint-Amour (c. 1200 – 1272)
 William of St-Thierry
 William of Sherwood (also Shyreswood &c.; 1190–1249)
 William of Soissons (12th century)
 William of Ware (fl. 1290–1305)
 Witelo (c. 1230 – c. 1290)
 Adam de Wodeham (1298–1358)
 John Wyclif (c. 1330 – 1384)
Walter Burley

X

Y 

 Yadava Prakaasa (12th century)
 Yehuda Halevi (c. 1085 – 1141)*

Z 
 Zeami Motokiyo (c. 1363 – c. 1443)
 Zhu Xi (or Chu Hsi) (1130–1200)

Notes

See also 
 List of philosophers
 List of philosophers born in the centuries BC
 List of philosophers born in the 1st through 10th centuries
 List of philosophers born in the 15th and 16th centuries
 List of philosophers born in the 17th century
 List of philosophers born in the 18th century
 List of philosophers born in the 19th century
 List of philosophers born in the 20th century

11